Sportivnaya (literally - Sportage)  is a station on the Frunzensko-Primorskaya Line of the Saint Petersburg Metro. The station was designed by Alexander Konstantinov, Alexander Bystrov and Andrey Larionov. It opened on 15 September 1997 as part of the Pravoberezhnaya Line. Sportivnaya is the only two-level single-vault transfer metro station outside Washington D.C. The floors are connected by two groups of escalators, one of which is closed . The lower floor serves the southbound trains while the upper floor serves the northbound ones. The upper floor is linked to the station's exit to south-eastern side of Petrogradsky island. Since 27 May 2015 the lower floor house an entrance to a transfer corridor equipped with moving walkway which link the station to the exit on the north-eastern side of Vasilyevsky island.

Nearby landmarks
The station is located in close proximity to the Petrovsky Stadium, the former home stadium of the city's home football team and Yubileyny Sports Palace. The station closed during and immediately after the team's home games, mostly due to apprehension over riot damage. The station is also located within walking distance of Peter and Paul Fortress.

Transport
Buses: 1, 10, 47, 128, 191, 227, 230, 249, 275. Trolleybuses: 1, 7, 9, 31. Trams: 6, 40 T1.

Gallery

References

Saint Petersburg Metro stations
Railway stations in Russia opened in 1997
Railway stations located underground in Russia